Pablo Birger (7 January 1924 – 9 March 1966) was an Argentine racing driver who raced in two World Championship Grands Prix for the Gordini team. He raced a Gordini Type 15 in the 1953 Argentine Grand Prix but the car lasted just twenty-one laps. Two years later he again rented a seat with Gordini, this time racing a Type 16, but spun on the first lap and collided with Carlos Menditeguy.

Birger, who was born in Buenos Aires, died in a road accident in his native city at the age of 42.

Complete Formula One World Championship results
(key)

References

1924 births
1966 deaths
Argentine racing drivers
Argentine Formula One drivers
Gordini Formula One drivers
Road incident deaths in Argentina
Argentine people of German descent
Racing drivers from Buenos Aires